Yewande is a given name. Notable people with the given name include:

Yewande Adekoya (born 1984), Nigerian actress, filmmaker, director, and producer
Yewande Akinola (born 1985), Nigerian engineer
Yewande Komolafe, food writer, author, and recipe developer
Yewande Omotoso (born 1980), South African-based Nigerian novelist, architect, and designer